The Donvale Football Club is an Australian rules football club located in Donvale, Victoria. They presently play in Division 3 of the Eastern Football League.

History
The club was founded in 1971 as Donvale United and played in the Eastern Suburban Churches Football Association in the A Grade competition. All clubs had to be aligned to a church. Donvale won their first match on April 17, 1971, defeating Highfield Road by 59 points. They went on make the Grand Final, only to be defeated by Box Hill Pioneers in their first season. But they picked up their first premiership the next year avenging the 1971 loss - thanks to strong tackling, stamina and enthusiasm under the guidance of John Henderson, winning by 48 points. They repeated the performance against the same club in 1973 winning by 30 points thanks partly to inaccuracy by Pioneers. Donvale continued to make the finals and won another premiership in 1977 defeating Burwood United by two points, 108 to 106. In 1979, Donvale were graced with the services of another former Collingwood player, Colin Tully. Henderson and Tully were members of Donvale's team of the decade for the 1970s.

From 1980 to 1984 however, Donvale only made the finals once in 1983, losing the first semi final. But from 1986 they started a golden run when the club dominated the ESCFA by playing off in six consecutive Grand finals and winning the last four over Hampton United, St Kevins Ormond, Burwood United and St Pauls.

In 1992, Donvale United transferred to the Eastern District FL and dropped the "United" from its name. They won the third division flag at their first attempt without losing a game. Promoted to the second division, Donvale only took two years to win another flag and promotion to the first division for the 1995 season.

In 1995, Donvale made the grand final but were beaten convincingly by Vermont. But in 1996 Donvale turned the tables and won yet another premiership over the Eagles.

From there, Donvale struggled and were demoted to the second division after the 2000 season - for the first time since the club's formation. In 2001, they rebounded back into first division defeating Mulgrave in the grand final. But after a grand final appearance in 2005, Donvale were again demoted in 2008 failing to win a game for the season for the first time. They competed in second division until 2013, twice just avoiding further relegation and also avoiding folding up after the 2010 season. In 2014 the club went into recess, before returning to play in the fourth division in 2015. In 2017 they won the division 4 premiership, defeating Forest Hill by 12 points in the grand final  and becoming the first club in the history of the league to win at least one senior premiership in all four divisions.

References

External links
 Official Eastern Football League site

Eastern Football League (Australia) clubs
Australian rules football clubs established in 1971
1971 establishments in Australia
Sport in the City of Manningham
Australian rules football clubs in Melbourne